Events in the year 2002 in Namibia.

Incumbents 

 President: Sam Nujoma
 Prime Minister: Hage Geingob (until 28 August), Theo-Ben Gurirab (from 28 August)
 Chief Justice of Namibia: Johan Strydom

Events 

 7 – 14 April – The 2002 ICC Six Nations Challenge was held in Windhoek, with the country also competing.

Deaths

References 

 
2000s in Namibia
Years of the 21st century in Namibia
Namibia
Namibia